Anita Grūbe (born 13 July 1955 in Riga) is a Latvian theatre and film actress.

References

External links

1955 births
Living people
Latvian stage actresses
Latvian film actresses
20th-century Latvian actresses
21st-century Latvian actresses
Actors from Riga